Zeča is an uninhabited Croatian island in the Adriatic Sea located southwest of Cres.

References

Uninhabited islands of Croatia
Islands of the Adriatic Sea
Islands of Croatia
Landforms of Primorje-Gorski Kotar County